Philip Giebler (born March 5, 1979 in Oxnard, California) is an American race car driver.

Giebler was considered a top American prospect with an opportunity to race in Formula One early in his career.  Following years in various Formula Three ranks, Giebler ran in Formula 3000 in 2003 half the season putting up a number of good results.  He returned stateside in 2004 running in the Infiniti Pro Series and Toyota Atlantic, capturing a win in his IPS debut at Homestead-Miami Speedway, before being named as one of A1 Grand Prix A1 Team USA's drivers. He competed in the 2005-2006 season, and the early part of the 2006-2007 season before being replaced by Jonathan Summerton.

Driving for Playa Del Racing, he qualified for the last starting position and was one of two rookie drivers (Milka Duno being the other) to race in the 2007 Indianapolis 500, but crashed and finished 29th. Despite this, he was the recipient of the Indianapolis 500 Rookie of the Year award for 2007. For 2008, he unsuccessfully attempted to qualify for the Indianapolis 500 with the same team, now known as American Dream Motorsports.

Racing record

Complete International Formula 3000 results
(key) (Races in bold indicate pole position; races in italics indicate fastest lap.)

American open–wheel racing results
(key)

Indy Lights

Atlantic Championship

IndyCar Series

 1 Run on same day.
 2 Non-points-paying, exhibition race.

Indianapolis 500

Complete A1 Grand Prix results
(key) (Races in bold indicate pole position) (Races in italics indicate fastest lap)

External links
 Philip Giebler's Website
 Profile at Racing Reference database
 Articles, photos & video's at Motorsport.com

1979 births
A1 Team USA drivers
American racing drivers
Atlantic Championship drivers
Formula Palmer Audi drivers
Indianapolis 500 drivers
Indianapolis 500 Rookies of the Year
Indy Lights drivers
IndyCar Series drivers
International Formula 3000 drivers
Living people
Sportspeople from Oxnard, California
Racing drivers from California
International Kart Federation drivers
Sportspeople from Ventura County, California
A1 Grand Prix drivers
Super Nova Racing drivers
Vision Racing drivers
AFS Racing drivers
La Filière drivers
David Price Racing drivers